Jocelyne Ratignier is a French football player who played as a forward for French club  Stade de Reims of the Division 1 Féminine. Ratignier represented France in the first FIFA-sanctioned women's international against the Netherlands, Ratignier scored a hat-trick in that game.

Literature

References

1954 births
Stade de Reims Féminines players
French women's footballers
France women's international footballers
Division 1 Féminine players
Women's association football forwards
Living people